Mooroolbark is a suburb of Melbourne, Victoria, Australia, 31 km north-east of Melbourne's central business district, located within the Shire of Yarra Ranges local government area.

Mooroolbark is at an elevation of approximately 93 metres.

History
"Mooroolbark" has been popularly believed for some time to have the meaning "red earth", leading to extensive use of that meaning in the community. More recently it has been suggested that "Mooroolbik" is the name given by the local Wurundjeri Aboriginal people ("moorool" meaning great water and "bik" meaning place). An alternative meaning of Mooroolbark being "the place where the wide waters meet" is recorded by Museum Victoria. Another meaning recorded is "red bark".

The Parish of Mooroolbark was surveyed in 1855, with a township originally called Brushy Creek standing where North Croydon is today. The name "Mooroolbark" was to be popularised with eventual European settlement in the late 19th century. A rural hub developed around the train station, which opened in 1887 and offered rail access to Melbourne. The Post Office opened shortly after on 15 March 1888.

Wonga Park used to be a part of Mooroolbark until the early 20th century when it became a separate suburb. Another locality called Mooroolbark Park was later renamed as Chirnside Park.

Transport

Mooroolbark has a train station which is on the Lilydale railway line. It has 595 car parking spaces. The station was rebuilt in 2021 as part of the Level Crossing Removal Project.

Bus routes
A number of bus routes serve the Mooroolbark area, and FlexiRide services, where passengers can request to be picked up or dropped off from home, also operate in the area. All services are operated by Ventura Bus Lines. Curiously for a Melbourne suburb, none of the buses which serve Mooroolbark run on Sundays, with the sole exception of the 664 which is more than a kilometre north of the railway station. Additionally, the FlexiRide services only run limited hours, falling well below the Victorian Government's minimum service standards.

Bus routes 664, 675, 680 and 689 and two FlexiRide routes service Mooroolbark. (All but 664 & 689 stop at the station)

664: Knox City Shopping Centre to Chirnside Park Shopping Centre (seven days)

675: to Chirnside Park Shopping Centre (Monday to Friday)

680: to Lilydale (Monday to Friday)

689: Croydon to Montrose (Monday to Saturday)

Mooroolbark FlexiRide (Monday to Saturday)

Croydon FlexiRide (Monday to Saturday)

"Five Ways"

Located in Mooroolbark is one of Melbourne's most unusual intersections between Hull Road, Lincoln Road, Manchester Road and Cambridge Road: three consecutive roundabouts (pictured). Initially, the three latter streets simply connected to Hull Road at close, but slightly different, locations. In order to eliminate the troubles caused by vehicles failing to give way to those coming from other adjoining streets, it was decided to build individual roundabouts at each intersection, and employ the standard 'give way' road rules. This has cleared up most of the troubles on Hull Road (southwest to northeast), but the prospect of passing through the intersection for those who don't know it may be a little daunting. This intersection is usually referred to by locals as "Five Ways" or "The Mooroolbark Roundabouts".

Shopping district
The main shopping district is located along Brice Avenue and Manchester Road, featuring a Coles supermarket, two gymnasiums, two pharmacies, fast food franchises, cafés, hair salons and thrift shops. Mooroolbark also has a tavern and wine bar.

Brice Avenue, the main shopping strip has a strict alcohol-free policy in place. The Alcohol Free Zone, if breached, may result in a fine of up to $2000. Under this law, anyone carrying an uncorked or unsealed alcoholic beverage, within the Mooroolbark township, can be fined at the discretion of the police. However, this doesn't apply to restaurants with an appropriate licence. Alcohol must be consumed within the licensed premises only, if the beverage is taken outside the premises in the public domain, police can issue a fine.

Police station
Mooroolbark has a 24-hour police station. It is located at the corner of Hull and Cambridge Roads ("Five Ways"), 700 metres from the Mooroolbark train station and town centre.

Schools
There are a number of primary and secondary schools within Mooroolbark offering a choice between government and private education.

Government schools
Bimbadeen Heights Primary School
Manchester Primary School
 Mooroolbark East Primary School
Pembroke Primary School
Rolling Hills Primary
 Mooroolbark College
 Yarra Hills Secondary College

Private schools
 Billanook College
Saint Peter Julian Eymard Catholic Parish Community School
Yarralinda Private Primary School

Community Centre & Places of Interest
Another point of interest within Mooroolbark is the Mooroolbark Community Centre, which has undergone radical changes since 2004 as part of a civil beautification and anti-graffiti project. The community centre is now surrounded by colourful mosaics and street art, including a stencil art representation of Mooroolbark's most famous citizen, the early 20th Century landscape designer Edna Walling.

The first Blue Light Disco in Australia was held in Mooroolbark in 1976. The 'Blue Light Disco', specifically a local Victoria Police initiative, is now a well-known attraction for teenagers Australia-wide.

The Mooroolbark library, a branch of Eastern Regional Libraries, is located at 7 Station Street. It offers a variety of events, including storytimes for preschool children. The library is next to Hookey Park, a children's adventure park.

Places of worship
 Mooroolbark Baptist Church
 Saint Margaret's Uniting Church
 Saint Peter Julian Eymard Catholic Church 
 Mooroolbark Neighbourhood Church
 Mooroolbark Christadelphians

Brushy Creek
Most of Mooroolbark is in the catchment of Brushy Creek, a tributary of the Yarra River. A number of environmental concerns exist because of its location almost entirely within an urban environment.

Community festivals
From 1980 to 2001, Mooroolbark had the 'Red Earth Festival', usually on the third or fourth weekend of March every year beginning on Friday evening and running all day Saturday and Sunday. The 'Red Earth Festival' had many stores and amusement rides. The highlights of that festival included a parade on the Saturday, which began in the grounds of the former Mooroolbark Primary School (which closed at the end of 2004) and went down Brice Avenue towards the fairground. On the Sunday, the festival hosted an open-air market followed by a fireworks display at night. Due to a number of problems including falling attendances and a significant increase in insurance premiums, the Red Earth Festival ran for the last time in March 2001.

Since 2002, there has been a smaller festival known as 'Celebrate Mooroolbark', at around the same time of the year.

Sport 
Mooroolbark Soccer Club "The Barkers" - founded as a Dutch team with the name Mooroolbark United Soccer Club in 1962, Mooroolbark's backing changed to a British influenced club in its formative years. In 1978 the United tagline was dropped from the name. The club's claim to fame is as Victoria's (and Australia's) first national sporting club side. Mooroolbark enabled the National Soccer League to proceed, breaking the deadlock which was then in force between the budding national league and clubs from Victoria whom the Victorian Soccer Federation had forbidden to join the competition.

Mooroolbark Football Club "The Mustangs" - Compete in Division 1 of the Eastern Football League. Their home ground is known as Heights Reserve, Longfellow Dr, Mooroolbark. Both Seniors and Juniors are represented by the club, with two junior girls teams joining the Club in 2017.

Air monitoring
Mooroolbark has an EPA 'Air Monitoring Station'. It measures Carbon Monoxide (CO) Nitrogen Dioxide (NO²) Ozone (O³) Particles. Monitoring began on Monday, 8 April 2002. Data is compiled by EPA Victoria.

Notable people
In 1836 John Gardiner, one of the first to bring cattle down from the Murrumbidgee in New South Wales to the Port Phillip District, was looking for some stray cattle east of Melbourne. His search took him via the Eltham and Yarra Glen areas to where Mooroolbark now is, and he found his cattle near the Olinda Creek. News of this new grazing land travelled back to Melbourne, and graziers soon brought their stock up the Yarra Valley. The first farmers in Mooroolbark were John Lithgow in 1845 and Robert Blair in 1847.

The early 20th Century landscape designer Edna Walling purchased  of land at Mooroolbark and built her first home from local and second hand materials. This home was named Sonning, after Gertrude Jekyll's Deanery Garden, Sonning, an English garden she had visited. Her property is now the Bickleigh Vale Estate in the eastern part of Mooroolbark, which is a private residential area but in the past has been open for public display as part of Australia's Open Garden Scheme. A stencil art representation of her is located at the Mooroolbark Community Centre.

Sam Mitchell, is an Australian Rules Football premiership captain and was born and raised in Mooroolbark. Prior to playing in the Australian Football League he played for the local club in Mooroolbark before moving to the Box Hill Hawks.

Barney McAll released a jazz album called Mooroolbark in 2015 which won an ARIA award.

Rebecca Barnard, an Australian singer-songwriter that fronted the band Rebecca's Empire was originally from Mooroolbark.

Heath Hocking, is an Australian rules footballer who plays for the Essendon Football Club. Originally from Mooroolbark, he was drafted by Essendon with the 20th selection in the 2006 Rookie Draft from Eastern Ranges in TAC Cup. He was elevated to the main list in 2007. Hocking played his 100th AFL game against the Carlton Football Club in round 3, 2014.

See also
 Mooroolbark Soccer Club
 Mooroolbark railway station

References

External links
 History of Mooroolbark
 History of Blue Light Discos in Victoria
 metlink: Yarra Ranges
 metlink: Telebuses
 Mooroolbark FC
 Celebrate Mooroolbark Festival

Suburbs of Melbourne
Suburbs of Yarra Ranges